The 8th Chunlan Cup was a 2011 international tournament for the board game of Go, which began on 27 March 2011 and concluded on 29/30 June. Defending champion Chang Hao was knocked out in the first round. The finalists were Xie He and Lee Sedol. Heo Yeongho and Gu Lingyi faced each other in the third-place match.

Tournament

Finals

References

2011 in go
International Go competitions